Kevin Bloody Wilson (born Dennis Bryant; 13 February 1947) is an Australian musical comedian who performs comical songs with his heavy Australian English accent and often including sexual themes. He has won one ARIA Music Award.

Early career 
Bryant was born in Bathurst, although he identifies with Kalgoorlie, Western Australia, where he was an electrician in the gold mines.

In the 1970s, Bryant fronted his own band called 'Bryan Dennis and the Country Club'. He also used the name 'Bryan Dennis' when he hosted a country music show on radio 6KG in Kalgoorlie from 1973 to 1980, before he was thrown off air for playing the parody song, "I'm Heaving on a Jet Plane".

He moved to Perth and began playing bawdy songs as a hobby, singing at pubs and Australian rules football clubs. In 1984, he put together a cassette of his songs called Your Average Australian Yobbo, which he sold at gigs and by mail order. He managed to sell 22,000 copies of the cassette before it was eventually transferred to LP, where it went on to sell many thousands more.

He is one of Perth's most famous comedians. His humour is regarded by media commentators as politically incorrect.
As one of Australia's most successful comedians, he continues to tour and performs an average of 120 concerts worldwide each year.

Wilson is married and his wife Betty comes on tour with him. She sells merchandise at shows and has appeared on guest vocals in a few of his songs, including "Dick'taphone".

Kevin appeared on the popular television show Enough Rope with Andrew Denton in October 2008, which resulted in the show's highest ratings of the year. On the show, he told of how he met his wife Betty, who was originally from Kalgoorlie, but lived in Perth at the time they met. She had returned to the town to visit friends and her brother who still lived there and they met when she attended one of his shows. Betty, who was in the studio audience, told Denton that Kevin was a romantic who regularly bought her flowers.

"The Genie in the Bottle" is a country song Kevin co-wrote with Adam Harvey that spent more than 6 weeks on the Australian Country Singles chart as well as reaching the number one video spot on the Country Music Television Channel in 2008.

Discography

Studio albums

Live albums

Compilation albums

His songs generally consist of irreverent humour and plenty of swearing with eclectic musical backing.

ARIA Awards
He has been nominated five times for ARIA Award for Best Comedy Release at the ARIA Music Awards:

|-
| 1987 || Kev's Back || Best Comedy Release ||  
|-
| 1987 || Kev's Back || Highest Selling Album ||  
|-
| 1990 || My Australian Roots || Best Comedy Release ||  
|-
| 1992 || Let's Call Him Kev || Best Comedy Release ||  
|-
| 1995 || Let Loose Live in London || Best Comedy Release ||  
|-
| 2002 || The Second Kumin' of Kev || Best Comedy Release ||  
|-

Website
Wilson was the first Australian performing artist to have a website which a friend set up for him in 1993, which has since been a major source of album and product sales. He also runs an internet radio station kevfm.com, which was the first 24-hour adult comedy radio station.

Daughter 
Tammy Jo "Jenny Talia" Bryant has followed in her father's footsteps singing similarly bawdy songs, some of them being reworded Kev songs, but done from a female perspective.

References

Further reading
 Britton, David (1985) Perth comic warned on language. The West Australian, 1 November 1985, p. 14.
 Nicholson, Brendan (1986) It's no joke for Kevin. Daily News, 4 January 1986, p. 4.
 Cornish, Patrick (1996) The Kalgoorlie kid comes home. West Australian, 12 October 1996, p. 4, (West Magazine).
 Chris Thomas (1996) Kevin's bloody well back home. Sunday Times, 13 October 1996, (Rock On).
 (1997) Wilson curse threat case. The West Australian, 20 February 1997, p. 40.
 Jansen, Ara (2004) Kevin Bloody Wilson Esquire West Australian, 10 April 2004, p. 10–13, (West Magazine).

External links
 Official Website

1947 births
Living people
Musicians from Sydney
People from Kalgoorlie
ARIA Award winners
Australian male comedians
Australian comedy musicians
Australian guitarists
Australian singer-songwriters
Australian country singers
Australian country guitarists
Australian male guitarists
Australian male singer-songwriters